The Adventurous Blonde is a 1937 American romantic comedy film directed by Frank McDonald and written by Robertson White and David Diamond. The film stars Glenda Farrell and Barton MacLane. It was released on November 13, 1937. This is the third film in the Torchy Blane movie series by Warner Bros. and is followed by Blondes at Work (1938).

Plot
Torchy Blane (Glenda Farrell) is handed a telegram, which she reads before realizing that it was actually for Theresa Gray (Natalie Moorhead) the woman sitting next to her on the train. Torchy's own telegram is from her boyfriend detective Steve McBride (Barton MacLane) announcing that he will have a minister waiting to marry them when she arrives at the train station.

When rival reporters jealous of Torchy's success, decides to get even for repeated news scoops by Torchy, and fearing that her forthcoming marriage to Steve McBride will forever keep them from getting news tips from the police department. Four reporters, Mat, Dud, Mugsy and Pete, decides to play a practical joke on her and conspire to fake the murder of an actor; for the dual purpose of blocking Steve's marriage to Torchy, and at the same time making her the laughing stock of all newspaper. The reporters hire an actor to play dead and phone Steve with the news. They hope that Torchy will report the death and that a second paper owned by publisher Mortimer Gray (Charles C. Wilson) will embarrass her by printing the truth. A fake broadcast comes to Steve and Torchy while driving to the minister in Steve's police car. The pair quickly goes to the scene of the crime and Torchy immediately phones her newspaper of the story. A newspaper extra edition, headlining the murder is quickly on the streets. The opposition newspapers print a denial of Torchy's story.

It is later learned that the hoax victim, Harvey Hammond, has actually been murdered and Torchy once again beat other reporters to the story. Several persons are suspects in Harvey's death including Grace Brown (Anne Nagel) an actress in Hammond's company, her boyfriend Hugo Brand (Anderson Lawler) and Theresa Gray, Hammond's ex-lover. Torchy frames Theresa for the murder in order to force a confession from publisher Mortimer Gray, her husband. Mortimer, who knew about the proposed joke, was jealous of his wife's relationship with Hammond and seized the opportunity to kill him. He confessed to the crime before taking poison. Cleared of any suspicion, Hugo and Grace are married by Torchy's waiting magistrate, and Torchy and Steve postpone their wedding once again.

Cast        
 Glenda Farrell as Torchy Blane
 Barton MacLane as Steve MacBride
 Anne Nagel as Grace Brown
 Tom Kennedy as Gahagan
 George E. Stone as Pete
 Natalie Moorhead as Theresa Gray
 William Hopper as Matt
 Charley Foy as Dud
 Anderson Lawler as Hugo Brand
 Bobby Watson as Mugsy
 Charles C. Wilson as Mortimer Gray

Home media
Warner Archive released a boxed set DVD collection featuring all nine Torchy Blane films on March 29, 2011.

References

External links
 
 
 
 

1937 films
1937 romantic comedy films
American black-and-white films
American romantic comedy films
American detective films
Films about journalists
Films directed by Frank McDonald
Warner Bros. films
American comedy mystery films
1930s comedy mystery films
Torchy Blane films
1930s English-language films
1930s American films